Laventille is a ward of Trinidad and Tobago.

Etymology
The name Laventille hearkens back to colonial times, especially when the French dominated the cultural traditions of the island. One etymological derivation of the name is because the northeast trade winds come to this part of the island of Trinidad before reaching any other part of colonial Port of Spain – hence the metaphorical name "La Ventaille" ("The Vent"). Geographically, it is the source of Orographic precipitation for the capital city.

Arts and culture

Laventille is the place where steel pan was born, and it is the birthplace of innovators and world-renowned tuners such as Rudolph Charles and Bertie Marshall.

It is the heart of the steelpan world, where pioneer Winston "Spree" Simon lived and created one of the century's new acoustical musical instruments. It is home to Desperadoes Steel Orchestra, one of the world's oldest steelbands, still in existence today. It also houses several other bands such as Laventille Hilanders, Courts Laventille Sound Specialists, and Tokyo. {Japan's capital city}

Laventille is also the birthplace of other notable people, including Soca artist Destra Garcia.

Events

Coopers trained at Angostura
In 2015, over a three-week period young persons were trained in the art of coopering at Angostura. This training involved the making of barrels from scratch. These barrel which can be used to store the "work in progress of rum" are an intrinsic part of the creation of the rum product.

Economy

The world famous Angostura Bitters is currently produced at the Angostura compound which is located off the Eastern Main Road in Laventille. This product is one of the older products of Trinidad and Tobago which has won many awards and which has been exported to many countries. The bitters forms an essential element in many drinks and dishes.

Many of the rums which are produced in Trinidad are made at the Angostura Compound. These rums are exported to many countries and earn valuable foreign exchange for the country. These rums are also used in ponche a creme, the local equivalent of egg nog.

For many years, MacFoods Meat processors was one of the larger employers in the area, as their factory produced top quality pork hams, marketed under the label "Blue Ribbon" hams.

Places of interest

Angostura Museum and Barcant Butterfly Collection
The Angostura Museum and Barcant Butterfly Collection are located in the Angostura compound, Eastern Main Road, Laventille.   The compound is located on 20 acres of land at Trinity Avenue and Eastern Main Road. This compound is located just on the outskirts of Port of Spain, heading towards Morvant. Access is obtained through the Eastern Main Road entrance.  In addition to the Museum, there are several buildings which are located on the compound, such as the Distillery, the Administration Offices and the Special Events Buildings for which bookings can be placed.

Fernandes Industrial Centre (FIC)

The Fernandes Industrial Centre (FIC) is located along the Eastern Main Road, close to the Morvant Junction. The FIC stretches from the Main Road, is intersected by the Priority Bus Route and continues to the Churchill Roosevelt Highway (CRH). However the Compound is not accessible from the CRH. The Centre offers warehousing, distribution and operating space for several different types of businesses, some of these are: Foundation for the Enhancement and Enrichment of Life. 

This Non-Governmental Organization (NGO) was founded by Mr Clive Pantin, brother of the late Archbishop Anthony Pantin of the Roman Catholic Archdiocese of Port of Spain, former principal of Fatima College. The organization is engaged in the collection, distribution of food items to those in need and other social services. Peter Sheppard Studio ~ Peter Sheppard has produced artwork which recreate historical scenes of Trinidad and Tobago.

References 

Geography of Port of Spain
Populated places in Trinidad and Tobago